Wheeler County is a county in the U.S. state of Nebraska. As of the 2010 United States Census, the population was 818. Its county seat is Bartlett. The county was formed in 1877 and organized in 1881. The county was named for Major Daniel H. Wheeler, longtime secretary of the Nebraska State Board of Agriculture.

In the Nebraska license plate system, Wheeler County is represented by the prefix 84 (it had the 84th-largest number of vehicles registered in the state when the license plate system was established in 1922).

Geography
The terrain of Wheeler County consists of low rolling hills, sloping to the east. A local drainage, Beaver Creek, flows to the SE and east through the upper part of the county, exiting near the midpoint of the county's east boundary line.

Major highways
  U.S. Highway 281
  Nebraska Highway 70
  Nebraska Highway 91

Adjacent counties

 Antelope County – northeast
 Boone County – southeast
 Greeley County – south
 Valley County – southwest
 Garfield County – west
 Holt County – north

Protected areas
 Pibel Lake State Recreation Area

History
Wheeler County was authorized in 1877. It was organized in 1881, following the establishment and rapid growth of the town of Cumminsville, in anticipation of a Union Pacific Railroad line through that town. Cedar City (now disbanded) was the site of the first seat of government for the county, which covered an area of 48 miles west to east and 25 miles north to south. On 25 November 1884, this area was halved, with the western portion becoming Garfield County, leaving the remainder as Wheeler County with its present boundaries.

The county's government was overseen by three commissioners, two from two districts in the more heavily populated southern half of the county, the third from the North. In 1885, the government was deemed to be outgrowing its small courthouse in Cedar City and two men, Cumminsville school superintendent Begelow and Ezra Bartlett Mitchell offered land options outside of Cedar City to build a new courthouse. In a heated election, Mitchell's site was chosen over Begelow's by a vote of 193 to 90, and the new courthouse led to the establishment of a surrounding town, named Bartlett (Mitchell's middle name), to serve as the seat of government. Cedar City collapsed shortly after the government offices there were abandoned.

In 1886, a spur line of the C.B.& Q. railroad was built into the county, ending at a point where the town of Ericson was established.

In 1895, while attempting to construct a ditchway to irrigate farm land between Ericson and Spalding, a dam was built across
Clear Creek. Though the ditch construction was ultimately not successful, the dam created present-day Pibel Lake.

Wheeler County's population began to wane after the turn of the 20th century, but in 1904, with the enactment of the Kinkaid Act, a new round of settlers reinvigorated the population.

Demographics

As of the 2000 United States Census, there were 886 people, 352 households, and 243 families in the county. The population density was 1.5 people per square mile (0.6/km2). There were 561 housing units at an average density of 1 per square mile (0.4/km2). The racial makeup of the county was 99.10% White, 0.23% Native American, 0.56% from other races, and 0.11% from two or more races.  0.56% of the population were Hispanic or Latino of any race. 47.4% were of German, 9.4% Irish, 7.8% English, 7.2% Swedish and 7.0% American ancestry.

There were 352 households, out of which 31.80% had children under the age of 18 living with them, 62.80% were married couples living together, 3.10% had a female householder with no husband present, and 30.70% were non-families. 29.00% of all households were made up of individuals, and 14.80% had someone living alone who was 65 years of age or older. The average household size was 2.52 and the average family size was 3.10.

The county population contained 29.10% under the age of 18, 6.40% from 18 to 24, 21.90% from 25 to 44, 25.70% from 45 to 64, and 16.80% who were 65 years of age or older. The median age was 40 years. For every 100 females there were 96.00 males. For every 100 females age 18 and over, there were 100.00 males.

The median income for a household in the county was $26,771, and the median income for a family was $33,750. Males had a median income of $21,563 versus $17,083 for females. The per capita income for the county was $14,355.  About 15.40% of families and 20.90% of the population were below the poverty line, including 27.80% of those under age 18 and 16.70% of those age 65 or over.

Communities

Villages 
 Bartlett (county seat)
 Ericson

Former communities
 Cumminsville
 Cedar City

Politics
Wheeler County voters have been reliably Republican for decades. In no national election since 1948 has the county selected the Democratic Party candidate (as of 2020).

See also
 National Register of Historic Places listings in Wheeler County, Nebraska

References

 
1881 establishments in Nebraska
Populated places established in 1881